Events in the year 1934 in Belgium.

Incumbents
Monarch – Albert I (until 17 February); Leopold III (from 23 February)
Prime Minister – Charles de Broqueville (to 20 November); Georges Theunis (from 20 November)

Events
 6 January – First electrified railway between Brussels and Antwerp taken into use.
 22 February – Funeral of King Albert.
 23 February – King Leopold sworn in as head of state.
 28 March – Socialist savings bank Bank van de Arbeid goes bankrupt.
 16 May – Firedamp explosion in Fief-de-Lambrechies and Pâturages kills 57.
 31 May – Law on languages in law cases passes Parliament.
 13 November – De Broqueville government resigns.
 20 November – New government led by Georges Theunis takes office.
 26 November – Meteorite impact near Roisin.

Publications
 Henry De Vocht, Monumenta Humanistica Lovaniensia: Texts and Studies about Louvain Humanists in the First Half of the XVIth Century

Art and architecture
 29 March – Surrealist group Rupture founded in La Louvière.

Exhibitions
 May–June – Le Minotaure (Brussels).

Films
 Belgium's first Dutch-language sound film, De Witte, screened in Antwerp (13 September).

Births
 21 January – François van Hoobrouck d'Aspre, politician (died 2020)
 6 June – Birth of Prince Albert

Deaths
 9 February – Henri Van Dyck (born 1849), painter
 17 February – King Albert (born 1875)

References

 
1930s in Belgium
Belgium
Years of the 20th century in Belgium
Belgium